The Trinidad Wing, Antilles Air Command is an inactive United States Air Force unit.  Its last assignment was with Antilles Air Command at Waller Field, Trinidad.  It was disbanded on 15 March 1944.

History
Engaged in antisubmarine operations.

Lineage
 Constituted as the 6th Interceptor Command on 17 October 1941
 Activated on 25 October 1941
 Redesignated 6th Fighter Command 15 May 1942
 Redesignated VI Fighter Command c. 18 September 1942 
 Redesignated Trinidad Wing, Antilles Air Command in October 1943.
 Disbanded on 15 March 1944

Assignments
 Sixth Air Force, 17 October 1941 – 1942
 Unknown, 1942 – 1 March 1943
 Antilles Air Task Force (later Antilles Air Command), 1 March 1943 – 15 March 1944

Stations
 Borinquen Field, Puerto Rico, 25 October 1941
 Henry Barracks, Puerto Rico, 20 March 1943
 Waller Field, Trinidad, 15 May 1943 – 15 March 1944

Units assigned
 Wing
 12 Pursuit Wing, 25 October 1941 – 6 March 1942

 Groups
 9th Bombardment Group: attached 28 January – c. 31 October 1942
 36th Fighter Group: 25 October 1941 – 4 June 1943
 40th Bombardment Group: attached 15 January 1942; assigned 6 April – 22 June 1942

 Squadrons
 12th Bombardment Squadron: 1 November 1942 – 24 July 1943 (Under Operational Control)
 59th Bombardment Squadron: 21 July 1942 – 19 March 1943 (Attached to Trinidad Detachment)

References

Notes
 Explanatory notes

 Citations

Bibliography

 
 

Wings of the United States Army Air Forces in World War II
Military units and formations disestablished in 1944